Great American Ball Park is a baseball stadium in Cincinnati, Ohio. It serves as the home stadium of the Cincinnati Reds of Major League Baseball (MLB), and opened on March 31, 2003, replacing Cinergy Field (formerly Riverfront Stadium), the Reds' home field from 1970 to 2002. Great American Insurance bought the naming rights to the new stadium at US$75 million for 30 years.

History

Planning and funding
In 1996, Hamilton County voters passed a ½% sales tax increase to fund the construction of new venues for both the Reds and the Cincinnati Bengals of the National Football League (NFL). According to the lease agreement, the Reds owed $2.5 million in rent annually for years 1–9 to Hamilton County, and owe $1 annually for years 10-35 of the contract. The Reds and the Bengals had previously shared occupancy of Riverfront Stadium, but by the mid-1990s, they complained that the multi-purpose stadium lacked amenities necessary for small-market professional sports teams to compete and each lobbied for venues of their own. Nearby Paul Brown Stadium broke ground in 1998 and was opened on August 19, 2000.

Design and construction
Great American Ball Park was built by the architectural firms HOK Sport (now Populous) and GBBN at a cost of approximately US$290 million. It is located on the plot of land between the former site of Riverfront Stadium (currently, The Banks mixed-use development) and Heritage Bank Center (previously, U.S. Bank Arena, previously Riverfront Coliseum). The limited construction space necessitated the partial demolition of Cinergy Field. It was fully demolished on December 29, 2002.
MSA Design  has been the Official Architect of the Cincinnati Reds since 2009.

2015 All-Star Game
The ballpark hosted the 2015 Major League Baseball All-Star Game. The Reds put in $5 million for improvements, which included two new bars and upgraded concession stands.

Features

The original address of Great American Ball Park was 100 Main Street. However, after the death of former pitcher and longtime broadcaster Joe Nuxhall in 2007, the address was changed to 100 Joe Nuxhall Way. A sign bearing Nuxhall's traditional signoff phrase "rounding third and heading for home" is located on the third base side exterior of the park. The Cincinnati Reds Hall of Fame and Museum is adjacent to Great American Ball Park. In honor of Crosley Field, the Cincinnati Reds' home park from 1912 to June 1970, a monument reminiscent of the park's infamous left field terrace was built on the main entrance plaza on Joe Nuxhall Way; statues of Crosley-era stars Nuxhall, catcher Ernie Lombardi, first baseman Ted Kluszewski, and outfielder Frank Robinson are depicted playing an imaginary baseball game. The distance to center field is the exact same distance as the distance to center field at the Reds' former home, Riverfront Stadium.

The Gap 
A 35-foot-(10.7-m)-wide break in the stands between home plate and third base called "The Gap" or "Gapper's Alley" is bridged by the concourse on each level (see photo). Aligned with Sycamore Street, it provides views into the stadium from downtown and out to the skyline from within the park.

Power Stacks 
In right center field, two smokestacks, reminiscent of the steamboats that were common on the Ohio River in the 19th and early 20th centuries, flash lights, emit flames and launch fireworks to incite or respond to the home team's efforts. When the Reds strike out a batter, fire blows out of the stacks beginning with the 2012 season (previously, steam was spewed out following a strikeout). Fireworks are launched from the stacks after every Reds home run and win. The seven baseball bats featured on both smokestacks symbolize the #14 of Pete Rose. On May 15, 2015, a part of the top of the right smokestack caught on fire during the 6th inning of a Reds game, caused by a loose propane valve, causing smoke to be blown across the field, several sections of seats to be evacuated, and the Cincinnati Fire Department being called to put it out. No one was injured.

The Spirit of Baseball 
A 50-foot-by-20-foot (15 x 6 m) Indiana limestone bas relief carving near the main entrance features a young baseball player looking up to the heroic figures of a batter, pitcher and fielder, all set against the background of many of Cincinnati's landmarks, including the riverfront and Union Terminal. Local designers and artist created the piece between 2001 and 2003 with concept, design and project oversight / management by Berberich Design. The illustrative artist was Mark Riedy, the sculptors of the scale model used for fabrication were Todd Myers and Paul Brooke with fabrication by Mees Distributors.

The Mosaics 
The mosaics depict two key eras in Reds history: "The First Nine", the 1869 Red Stockings who were the first professional baseball team in history with a record of 57–0 in their first season and "The Great Eight", the famous Big Red Machine that won back-to-back World Series in 1975 and 1976. The mosaics were created between 2001 and 2003 with concept, design and project oversight / management by Berberich Design. The illustrative artist was Mark Riedy. These mosaic panels are made of opaque glass tiles and were produced in Ravenna, Italy by SICIS.

The Scoreboard 
This scoreboard was originally built by the Trans-Lux company in 2003, and featured a monochrome scoreboard in addition to a smaller color videoboard, as well as 5 banners for sponsors. After the Trans-Lux company collapsed in 2008, the Reds paid $4 million to install a new, LED scoreboard and HD video screen from Daktronics in time for the 2009 season. The scoreboard was replaced with a full-color videoboard as part of these renovations and was capable of showing HD video. The sponsor banners were moved to the sides of the scoreboard, and an additional one was added. The scoreboard clock was originally a replica of the Longines clock at Crosley Field, but has since been modified.

The scoreboard was replaced in 2020 with a larger videoboard as part of a general overhaul of the videoboards in Great American Ball Park. The sponsorship banners on the right side were replaced with additional video space. All of the videoboards throughout the facility are capable of showing high dynamic range (HDR) content, thus making it the first MLB facility with a fully integrated HDR video system.

Home Run Deck 

Crosley Terrace 
As a nod to Crosley Field, the Reds' home from 1912 to 1970, a monument was created in front of the main entrance to highlight the park's famous left-field terrace. Bronze statues of Crosley-era stars Joe Nuxhall, Ernie Lombardi, Ted Kluszewski, and Frank Robinson (created by sculptor Tom Tsuchiya) are depicted playing in an imaginary ballgame. The grass area of the terrace has the same slope as the outfield terrace at Crosley Field.

4192 Mural 
This was replaced with new banners in 2015 as part of the All-Star Game upgrades.

Cincinnati Reds Hall of Fame and Museum 
Located on the west side of Great American Ball Park on Main Street, the Hall of Fame and Museum celebrate the Reds' past through galleries and extensive use of multimedia. The Hall of Fame has been in existence since 1958, but did not previously have a building.

Rose Garden 
Adjacent to both the stadium and the Reds Hall of Fame is a rose garden that symbolizes Pete Rose's record-breaking 4,192nd hit. It was strategically placed here because the ball landed around this area in Riverfront Stadium. The garden is visible from a stairwell in the hall of fame displaying the number of balls that Rose hit. This was replaced with a different marker as part of the construction of the 1869 Pavilion in 2019.

Fan amenities

Nursing Suites 
For the 2015 season, Great American Ball Park became the first MLB ballpark to feature a suite designed exclusively as a place for mothers to feed and care for their babies. Reds COO Phil Castellini, a father of 5, says he felt compelled to do his best to provide a worthwhile solution after stadium officials told him an increasing number of women were asking where they could nurse their children at the ballpark. The suite has 5 glider chairs, diaper-changing stations, a restroom, a kitchenette, refrigerator, lockers, and televisions showing the game. It's located on the Suite Level near the Champions Club elevators. A second nursing suite was added as part of the addition of the TriHealth Family Zone on the former site of Redlegs Landing.

Sportsbook 
For the 2023 season, the Reds partnered with BetMGM Sportsbook to introduce on-site sports betting. The BetMGM Sportsbook at Great American Ball Park is located in the Machine Room, and features three betting windows and 15 self-service kiosks, in addition to a full-service bar and food options.

Notable non-baseball events

Concerts

Other events
On October 31, 2004, President George W. Bush and First Lady Laura Bush held a campaign rally in Great American Ball Park.
On April 27, 2008, a memorial service for Staff Sergeant Keith Matthew Maupin was held at Great American Ball Park.

Milestones and notable moments

Opening day (March 31, 2003)

Other firsts

Attendance records
Bold indicates the winner of each game.

References

Bibliography
 Leventhal, Josh, Take Me Out to the Ballpark: An Illustrated Tour of Baseball Parks Past and Present. Black Dog & Leventhal Publishers, 2006. 
 Stupp, Dann, Opening Day at Great American Ball Park. Sports Publishing L.L.C., 2003.

External links

 Stadium site on MLB.com
 Cincinnati Reds Hall of Fame and Museum
 retrosheet.org Great American Ball Park list of firsts
 Cincinnati Reds - Ballpark Tours
 Great American Ballpark Photos
 Great American Ball Park Seating Chart

Cincinnati Reds stadiums
Sports venues in Cincinnati
Major League Baseball venues
Sports venues completed in 2003
Baseball venues in Ohio
2003 establishments in Ohio
Populous (company) buildings
Olympic stadiums